Al Neel Sports Club also known as Al Neel Al-Hasahisa is a Sudanese football club based in Al-Hasahisa. They used to play in the top division in Sudanese football before being relegated to the 2nd division of Sudanese football after finishing 13th in the 2014 season, Sudan Premier League. Their home stadium is Al-Hasahisa Stadium located in Al-Hasahisa locality in al Gezira state. They are concerned about the impact that global warming will have on their stadium. Al Neel is one of the top Sudanese football clubs that participated in the regional African competitions.

Performance in CAF competitions
CAF Confederation Cup: 1 appearance
2011 – First Round

Crest

Current squad
This is the current squad of the team :

References

External links
Team profile – goalzz.com
Team profile – footballzz.com
Team profile – leballonrond.fr

Football clubs in Sudan
1957 establishments in Sudan
Association football clubs established in 1957